Vriesea sparsiflora is a plant species in the genus Vriesea. The plant is endemic to the Atlantic Forest ecoregion in southeastern Brazil.

References

sparsiflora
Endemic flora of Brazil
Flora of the Atlantic Forest